Love Is Where You Find It is the eleventh studio album by American R&B/soul group, the Whispers, released on April 5, 1981 by SOLAR Records. It reached number 1 on the Billboard Top Soul Albums chart.

Track listing

Charts

See also
List of Billboard number-one R&B albums of 1982

References

External links
 Whispers* – Love Is Where You Find It at Discogs

1981 albums
Albums produced by Leon Sylvers III
Contemporary R&B albums by American artists
Quiet storm albums
SOLAR Records albums
The Whispers albums